Wolfgang Francis Novogratz (born May 9, 1997) is an American actor and model.  He has appeared in the Netflix films Sierra Burgess Is a Loser (2018), The Last Summer (2019), The Half of It (2020) and Feel the Beat (2020).  He also appeared in the film Yes, God, Yes (2019).

Early life 
Novogratz was born on May 9, 1997, to interior-design couple Robert and Cortney Novogratz from Bravo's 9 By Design. He has six younger siblings, Bellamy (1998), Tallulah (1998), Breaker (2000), Five (2005), Holleder (2005), and Major (2009), and is the nephew of Wall Street billionaire Mike Novogratz.  He was born and raised in Manhattan.

Novogratz played high school basketball at Harvard-Westlake School in Los Angeles, leading the Wolverines to a CIF Division IV state championship as a senior.

Filmography

Film

Television

References

External links
 

1997 births
Living people
21st-century American male actors
American male film actors
Male actors from New York (state)
Male actors from New York City
People from Manhattan